Fat Salt & Flame is the seventh studio album by Filipino alternative rock band Sandwich, released on April 12, 2013 by PolyEast Records. The album also marks the band's 15th anniversary.

Accolades

In other media
The song "Mayday" was used in the film Ang Nawawala. "Kidlat", on the other hand, was used in the eponymous superhero television series aired on TV5.

Track listing

References

2013 albums
Sandwich (band) albums
Tagalog-language albums
PolyEast Records albums